The Right to Live is a 1935 American drama film directed by William Keighley and starring Josephine Hutchinson, George Brent and Colin Clive. The film was shot at Warner Brothers's Burbank Studios, with sets designed by the art director Esdras Hartley.

It is based on the 1928 play The Sacred Flame by Somerset Maugham, previously adapted into a film by the studio in 1929.

Synopsis
Maurice Trent proposes marriage to Stella Trent after an evening at the opera. She accepts, but shortly after their wedding he is badly injured while flying a plane. He loses the uses of his legs, and becomes deeply concerned that he can no longer be a proper husband to Stella. He clings to the hope that he will recover his ability to walk. When his brother Colin arrives from the coffee plantation he owns in Brazil, Maurice enlists him to escort her around the nightlife of London in the way he no longer can. Over the months that follow Colin and Stella develop a passionate love for each other, despite Stella's guilt about her husband.

When he learns from his doctor that he will never be able to walk again, Maurice is devastated. The same night Stella has resolved to run away with Colin to Brazil, but after an emotional talk with her husband she knows she can never leave him. The next morning Maurice is found dead by his nurse Miss Wayland, who has long nurtured a secret love for him. Distressed and jealous of Stella whom she has always resented, she accuses her of murdering him with an overdose of sleeping pills. It is left to Maurice's mother to explain that he killed himself, realizing that he could never recover, to free Stella to live her life.

Cast       
 Josephine Hutchinson as Stella Trent
 George Brent as Colin Trent
 Colin Clive as Maurice
 Peggy Wood as Nurse Wayland
 Henrietta Crosman as Mrs. Trent
 C. Aubrey Smith as Major Licondra
 Leo G. Carroll as Dr. Harvester
 Phyllis Coghlan as Alice
 Claude King as Mr. Pride
 Nella Walker as Mrs. Pride
 Halliwell Hobbes as Sir Stephen Barr
 J. Gunnis Davis Harvey, the  Gardener

References

External links 
 
 
 
 

1935 films
1930s English-language films
Warner Bros. films
American drama films
1935 drama films
Films directed by William Keighley
American black-and-white films
Films set in London
Films shot in Burbank, California
American films based on plays
Films based on works by W. Somerset Maugham
1930s American films
Films scored by Bernhard Kaun